The Real Milli Vanilli was a pop music group that consisted of some of the original singers from Milli Vanilli, Brad Howell and John Davis, as well as new singers Gina Mohammed and Ray Horton and several "special guests," including Tammy T, Icy Bro and B-Sho'-Rockin'.

The group's only album, The Moment of Truth, was originally meant to be Milli Vanilli's second album, but the news about Rob Pilatus and Fab Morvan not having sung on the first album and lip synching during live performances broke before it could be released. Frank Farian then reformed the group under the name "The Real Milli Vanilli," changing the cover of the album to feature singers Howell, Icy Bro, Horton, Mohammed and Davis. The original proposed title of the album was Keep on Running, the title of the first single released from the album.  

The Moment of Truth was released only in Brazil, Europe, Asia and New Zealand and reached the top 20 in Germany. The Real Milli Vanilli also released three singles, one of which ("Keep on Running") made it to #4 in the German charts.

Seven of the songs from The Moment of Truth were reworked and released under the name Try 'n' B on their self-titled debut album, with the addition of Tracy Ganser and Kevin Weatherspoon on vocals. The album contained three additional recordings: "Ding Dong," "Who Do You Love" and a cover of Dr. Hook's "Sexy Eyes."     

The group's "When I Die" achieved more exposure when German eurodance group No Mercy covered it for their 1996 debut album My Promise. The song was released as the third single from the album in November 1996 and reached #1 in Austria and the Netherlands.

Davis died on 24 May 2021 from COVID-19.

Discography

Albums
The Moment of Truth (1991)

Singles
"Keep on Running" (1990)
"Tell Me Where It Hurts" (1991)
"Too Late (True Love)" (1991)
"Nice 'n' Easy" (1991)

See also 
Milli Vanilli

References

External links 
The Real Milli Vanilli website
'The Moment of Truth' at Crap from the Past

1990 establishments in West Germany
1992 disestablishments in Germany
American pop music groups
Milli Vanilli
American dance music groups
Musical groups established in 1990
Musical groups disestablished in 1992